Arkathias was the Orontid king of Sophene in the second half of the 2nd-century BC. His name is of Iranian origin, although its etymology remains uncertain. The Polish historian Michał Marciak suggests that Arkathias was the founder of the royal city of Carcathiocerta. Present scholarship maintain that Arkathias ruled after Mithrobouzanes and before Artanes, however, this is subject to further confirmation.

References

Sources 
 

Kings of Sophene
Year of birth unknown
Year of death unknown